Niels De Pauw (born 19 January 1996) is a Belgian footballer who currently plays for KSV Temse.

External links

1996 births
Living people
Belgian footballers
S.K. Beveren players
Sportkring Sint-Niklaas players
Belgian Pro League players
Association football defenders